Wilson Edgar James Kneeshaw (born 17 May 1994) is an English footballer who plays as a forward for Newcastle Independent.

Club career
Kneeshaw began his career in Middlesbrough's youth system before playing for ACS Poli Timișoara in Liga I, the Romanian top division. He then appeared for Darlington 1883 and Blyth Spartans in English non-league football and for United Soccer League team Sacramento Republic.

He joined National League North club Darlington in February 2019 on a short-term deal, and made 11 appearances before a ruptured Achilles tendon put a premature end to his season.

During the 2021–22 season, Kneeshaw featured for Northern Football Alliance side Newcastle Independent as they lifted the Division One league title.

Personal life
Kneeshaw's brother Jackson featured on the British reality TV series Ibiza Weekender.

References

1994 births
Living people
Footballers from Darlington
English footballers
Association football forwards
Middlesbrough F.C. players
ACS Poli Timișoara players
Darlington F.C. players
Blyth Spartans A.F.C. players
Sacramento Republic FC players
Liga I players
Northern Premier League players
USL Championship players
National League (English football) players
English expatriate sportspeople in Romania
English expatriate sportspeople in the United States
Expatriate footballers in Romania
Expatriate soccer players in the United States
English expatriate footballers